This list includes all characters from the Pixar media franchise Monsters, Inc., including the 2001 film Monsters, Inc., the 2013 film Monsters University, and the 2021 Disney+ series Monsters at Work.

Appearing in both films

James P. "Sulley" Sullivan
James P. "Sulley" Sullivan (voiced by John Goodman in the film series and the Disney+ series, Brian Cummings in the Monsters, Inc. video game, Joel McCrary in Disney Infinity and Disney Infinity 3.0 and Christopher Swindle in Kingdom Hearts III) is a furry, light-blue-and-purple-spotted monster with a humanoid bear face, short devilish horns, dark blue eyebrows, and a cat-like nose. He has muscular limbs, a reptilian tail, dorsal spikes, and feline fangs. He excels at scaring children, but is kind and has an amiable personality.

Monsters University depicts a younger Sulley as a talented but lazy student whose father Bill had made a name for himself as a scarer. He meets Mike Wazowski in a SCARE 101 class. What begins as a rivalry between the two monsters becomes a friendship that endures after they are both expelled.

In Monsters at Work, he is elected as Co-CEO of Monsters Inc.

Mike Wazowski

Michael "Mike" Wazowski (voiced by Billy Crystal in the film series, shorts, and the Disney+ series, Carlos Alazraqui in the video games, merchandise, attractions and commercials and Noah Johnston as his younger self in Monsters University) is a green cyclops-like monster with a round body, two small horns, and thin arms. He has four fingers on each hand and three toes on each foot. Mike is depicted as a proud, confident monster, but he had a lonely childhood and he struggles to make friends.

On a class field trip to Monsters, Inc., Mike is inspired to become a professional scarer.

He gets accepted into the Monsters University scare program years later where he meets both James P. Sullivan and Randall Boggs in a SCARE 101 class. Mike initially dislikes Sulley for his arrogance and bad work ethic. He likes Randall because he's a Scaring major and his roommate at the time. It is seen that Randall and Mike hang out a lot, studying together and even sitting next to each other in class. After failing the class, Mike works out a deal with the school's dean to re-enroll in the program on the stipulation that he wins the Scare Games. Sulley joins Mike, despite Mike's protests. Mike and Sulley join the Oozma Kappa fraternity to qualify for the Games. Mike and Sulley begin to build a friendship as they compete together. During the final event, Sulley cheats. Mike is devastated his team won by cheating and later breaks into the door-lab to unsuccessfully collect a child's scream before Sulley saves him. These actions result in both Mike and Sulley being expelled from school. After being expelled, the two apply as workers in the Monsters, Inc. mailroom. They advance through the ranks until Sully becomes a scarer with Mike as his assistant.

In Monsters, Inc., Mike runs Sulley's station on the scare floor and they are close friends and roommates. Mike is in a relationship with Celia Mae at this time. Additionally, Mike helps Sulley in his mission to save Boo. While Sulley bonds with Boo, Mike desperately wants her gone. Randall finds out his involvement from the glimpse of him near Boo in a newspaper and Mike makes a deal with him to return Boo. However, this makes Sulley suspicious and Mike tries to prove him wrong. Randall ends up kidnapping Mike for the scream extractor. At the last second, Mike is saved from the extractor by Sulley and after he and Sulley foil Randall's plot, they report Waternoose’s involvement in the scheme to the CDA. Mike is portrayed as a comedian in Tomorrowland at the Magic Kingdom in Walt Disney World Resort attraction, Monsters, Inc. Laugh Floor. Mike is not only known for his humor but also his intelligence.

He has made appearances in other Pixar movies, such as Finding Nemo (2003), Cars (2006), WALL-E (2008), and Toy Story 3 (2010).

In Monsters at Work, he is elected Co-CEO and teaches Scary Monsters how to be funny.

Randall Boggs
Randall "Randy" Boggs (voiced by Steve Buscemi in the film series, Peter Kelamis in the Disney Infinity video game series and J.P. Manoux in the video game and Kingdom Hearts III) is a purple, eight-legged, salamander-headed, chameleon-like monster who can change his skin color to blend in with his surroundings. He is an excellent climber. He is Sulley's arch-rival and Mike's nemesis and former best friend.

In Monsters, Inc., he vies for the position as the area's top scream collector, a competition set up to encourage working. Randall does manage to win top position for a few seconds until Sulley returns from a slumber party, thus winning it back. They also compete for the All-Time Scare Record. It is later discovered that Randall has an ulterior motive: he and his long-suffering assistant Jeff Fungus are building a large vacuum-like machine dubbed the Scream Extractor, which is capable of collecting the screams of human children that he plans to capture and extract their pneumothoraxes, thus asphyxiating its victims. They collaborate with Waternoose to save the company by kidnapping human children to solve the crisis and allow Randall to rise to a higher position, but also secretly planning to betray Waternoose and take over the company. One late night, sometime after Randall had finished building the Scream Extractor, Randall leaves a door activated on the Scare Floor, and a human child (later named Boo) wanders out. After discovering that she is in the factory and learning that Sulley and Mike had something to do with it, he makes a deal with Mike: he will bring Boo's door to his station during lunch, where they will be able to return Boo, but he secretly hides in Boo's room waiting to capture her. When a suspicious Sulley refuses to trust Randall's plan, Mike goes into the room instead to prove Sulley wrong, leading Randall to kidnap Mike by mistake. He nevertheless decides to use Mike as a test subject for the machine, but Sulley rescues him and Fungus is put in front of the machine instead and is completely blanched white at the end. He is soon revealed to have Waternoose as his partner, who banishes Sulley and Mike to the Himalayas to ensure that they cannot interfere with their plan and expose it to the public. Before Randall could extract the scream from her, Sulley returns and destroys the machine (using it to pin Waternoose, Randall, and Fungus to the wall, but Randall was quick enough to dodge it), thus rescuing Boo. Randall attempt to stop Sulley's escape, but is unexpectedly foiled by Mike. After a long chase through millions of doors in the factory's door storage facility, Boo eventually conquers her fear of Randall and stops him from pushing Sulley out of an open door, buying Sulley enough time to defeat him. Afterward, Randall is forcibly exiled to the human world and winds up in a mobile home where the inhabitants beat him senseless, thinking he is an alligator. This is the same mobile home scene where A Bug's Life is filmed when Flik travels to the city to get tougher bugs. Sulley and Mike then destroy the door to prevent Randall's return. Later, Waternoose is exposed and arrested for his crimes while Fungus repents and gets back on the right track.

In the prequel Monsters University, Randall enrolls at the same time as Mike and the two end up as friends and roommates. He is insecure and shy at first, having trouble controlling his camouflage abilities, but is a model bookworm. When Randall is accepted into Roar Omega Roar, the top fraternity in the university, he quickly abandons Mike in order to retain his standing with the fraternity. He becomes more ambitious, confident, and self-centered. After an embarrassing loss to Sulley at the Scare Games, an embittered Randall vows he'll never be outdone by Sulley again. In Kingdom Hearts III, which takes place sometime after the film, he reappears to both Sully and Mike's surprise, who claim that he was exiled for attempting to forcefully collect screams (for some reason, Waternoose is not mentioned despite his involvement in Randall's plot). Randall explains that a member of Organization XIII (revealed to be Vanitas) repaired his door which allowed him to return. He plans on harnessing negative energy to have kids become permanently sad. After he creates an Unversed monster with the help of Vanitas, he hopes to bring down Sully and Mike and take over as CEO of Monsters Inc. Randall is defeated and is forced back through his door and permanently exiled, followed by Sora locking the door, causing it to disappear. This prevents Randell from ever returning to the Monstropolis.

Roz
Roz (voiced by Bob Peterson) is a snail-like monster who is the key master and administrator of Scare Floor F. Near the end of the film, she is revealed to be Number One of the CDA, having been on an undercover assignment to investigate the company and expose Randall and Waternoose's scheme. She appears briefly near the end of the prequel as a member of the CDA squad that responds to the break-in at the Door Lab. Although she wears a full-body protective suit that covers her face, her shape and voice give away her identity. She reappears in the first episode of Monsters at Work, informing Mike and Sulley that the board of directors were putting them in charge of Monsters, Inc. and that her old undercover job was being given to her sister Roze. It is revealed in the season finale that she also works for the Monstropolis Energy Regulatory Commission (M.E.R.C), and that there's still a lot we don't know about her.

CDA
The Child Detection Agency (or CDA for short) are an assortment of different monsters in hazmat suits (variously voiced by Rodger Bumpass, Pete Docter, Bill Farmer, Teddy Newton, David Silverman, and Lee Unkrich) whose main job is to respond to any reported incidents of contact between monsters and children or their belongings, since it is believed that human objects are toxic. They isolate and destroy any items accidentally brought back into the monster world. Any monsters that come in contact with a human object are quickly and forcibly decontaminated and get a neck cone applied afterwards. The CDA's first appearance in the film frachise is when George Sanderson gets a sock on him; the sock is subsequently destroyed and Sanderson decontaminated. After Boo appears at Harryhausen's, the CDA decontaminates the building and disinfects its patrons. They find the bag containing Boo that Mike and Sulley left behind at the restaurant, which trace them back to Monsters, Inc. where they end up searching the building. In one moment, two of the CDA members ask Sulley for an autograph to give to Bethany, the daughter of agent 00002, whom he mentions. Henry J. Waternoose had the CDA called in to cut the power to Boo's door as soon as it lands so as to contain Boo and arrest Mike and Sulley. Mike does a diversion that involved throwing one of Boo's socks on one of the agents and lures the others to him. Mike allows the agents to overhear Waternoose' confession, and they arrest him, while Roz reveals her affiliation with CDA. In the outtakes, a CDA agent directs a monster to his seat during Mike and Sulley's play "Put That Thing Back Where It Came From or So Help Me". In Monsters University, the CDA are called when Mike and Sulley had entered a door that led to a human camping site, and later take both away after they return successfully.

Abominable Snowman
The Abominable Snowman (voiced by John Ratzenberger) is a white-furred monster from Monstropolis who got banished to the Himalayas in the human world. He is an expert at making snow cones. The Abominable Snowman greets Sulley and Mike when Waternoose banish them to the Himalayas. While the Abominable Snowman tries to make Sulley and Mike feel at home in his abode, he understands Sulley must rescue Boo, and tells him of a Nepalese village at the foot of the mountain where they can regain access to the monster world. Despite everything, the Abominable Snowman seems to have made the most of his fate and genuinely seems to enjoy the human world.

In the epilogue of the end credits in Cars (2006), the Abominable Snowplow makes a cameo appearance.

In Monsters University, he was shown to have worked as a mailroom supervisor at Monsters, Inc. He warns Mike and Sulley not to tamper with the mail which is a crime punishable by banishment.

In Monsters at Work, it is revealed that he was banished by Waternoose after stumbling across a letter detailing the Scream Extractor plot. Sulley later invites him back. Once that was done, the Abominable Snowman works as a snow cone salesman at Monsters, Inc. under the new name of Adorable.

Appearing in Monsters, Inc.

Boo
Boo (voiced by Mary Gibbs) is a 2-year-old human girl who becomes Sulley and Mike's friend. During Randall's secret late-night work on the Scare Floor, Boo gets into the factory and Sulley tries various attempts to put her back, none of which worked, so he eventually puts her inside a duffle bag. When Sulley brings this up with Mike at Harryhausen's, Boo gets out and scares the patrons; the CDA have to "decontaminate" the restaurant. While Mike and Sulley are at home, they discover that the girl is not toxic after all. Sulley quickly grows attached to the girl and names her "Boo" while Mike desires to be rid of her. The next day, they smuggle her into the factory disguised as a child of one of Sulley's relatives, and Mike attempts to return her through her door. After learning of Boo's presence, Randall tries to kidnap Boo by making a deal with Mike, but due to Sulley and Boo not trusting Randall's motive, he kidnaps Mike by mistake; Sulley later rescues him. Boo may not be afraid of Sulley, but when she was brought into the training room (which is a simulator where scare recruits do their training) after Mike and Sulley escaped from Randall, she ended up frightened by Sulley's roar. When Mike and Sulley tried to return Boo to her home, Waternoose had Mike and Sulley exiled to the Himalayas to keep them from causing further interference with his malevolent plan. Sulley returns to the factory and rescues Boo from Randall's Scream Extractor (a large machine that is capable of extracting and collecting a child's scream), destroying the machine in the process. During the chase through the large storage vault, Boo's laughter ends up causing all the doors to operate. Eventually, Boo gets over being afraid of Randall and helps to defeat him. Sulley and Mike are able to access Boo's door, but Waternoose and the CDA send it back to the Scare Floor. Mike distracts the CDA carrying what they think is Boo, while Sulley escapes with Boo and her door, although Waternoose follows after they accidentally get his attention. Waternoose is arrested after his plot is exposed; the CDA's undercover leader is revealed to be Roz, and she allows Sulley and Mike five minutes to return Boo to her world. Once Sulley and Mike have returned Boo to her room, her door is put through the shredder to ensure her safety. Boo tries to see Sulley again, but only finds her ordinary closet behind her door. Sometime later, Mike takes Sulley to one side and reveals he has rebuilt Boo's door and it required only one more piece, which Sulley had taken as a memento (the one taped to his clipboard). Sulley inserts the last piece, reactivates the door and enters to find Boo there.

Monsters, Inc. employees

Henry J. Waternoose
Henry J. Waternoose III (voiced by James Coburn) is a spider-like monster with five eyes, seven claws on each hand, six crab-like legs, who wears a business suit. He is the former company president and the CEO of Monsters, Inc. The company has been in Waternoose's family for three generations as he had inherited the company from his father at the age of 142. Waternoose also previously had a mentoring relationship with Sulley.  Waternoose is first seen when he reminds Thaddeus Bile and the other trainees (Bill, Dave and Owen) about the dangers of a human child getting into Monstropolis after Thaddeus left the door opened. He had been impressed with Sulley's progress. However, Mr. Waternoose is distraught to learn that the impending energy crisis is increasing, due to many children being desensitized and being unable to be scared by monsters, which might put the company on the verge of being shut down. When Sulley tells Waternoose he can get the company through the energy crisis, he tells Sulley to tell that to the board of directors. When Boo is eventually discovered, Sulley and Mike inform Waternoose of Randall's plan. Waternoose seemingly promises to set things right for them, but instead reveals that he is in league with Randall's plan; Waternoose was actually planning to save the company by kidnapping human children to extract their screams with Randall's help. At this point, Waternoose exiles Sulley and Mike to the Himalayas to keep them from interfering with his plan any further, though he later regrets it since he loses his top employees just to keep his scheme from getting out, but Randall reminds Waternoose about keeping the company running. However, Randall also intends on betraying him. After Sulley and Mike manage to find their way back to the monster world, they rescue Boo, destroy the Scream Extractor, defeat Randall, and trap him in the Everglades. Meanwhile, Waternoose has called in the CDA to apprehend Boo and arrest Sulley and Mike for their role in her appearance in Monstropolis. Sulley and Mike trick Waternoose into exposing his plan to the CDA, and the agents arrest him. As he is being dragged away, Waternoose accuses Sulley of "destroying" the company and exacerbating the energy crisis before the CDA locks him in a van. Sulley becomes the new CEO of Monsters Inc. and proves Waternoose's prediction wrong, as laughter generates ten times the energy of screams, thereby allowing Sulley to both salvage Monsters Inc. and resolve the crisis.

In Monsters University, Waternoose makes a cameo on an image where he shakes hands with Sulley and Mike, who are being promoted as scare team members. He also cameos in the first episode of Monsters at Work, where his image appears during the outdated orientation video; his arrest is also mentioned twice. A later episode reveals that his file has been wiped clean. The Xenon processor, used in the Xbox 360, developed by Microsoft and IBM under the IBM chip program was codenamed "Waternoose" in the character's honor.

Celia Mae
Celia Mae (voiced by Jennifer Tilly) is a pink cyclops gorgon-like monster with purple snakes for hair, tentacles for legs, who wears a slick sleeveless green dress, with a gill-print design and a blueish green furry collar. She works as a receptionist at Monsters, Inc. and is Mike Wazowski's girlfriend. When Mike is on a date with Celia at Harryhausen's, a Japanese sushi restaurant, to honor her birthday, a little child made herself known as the CDA raid the place and use a device that caused an energy dome that engulfed Harryhausen's. Celia was among the monsters who were decontaminated at that time, which then forces her and her snakes hairs to wear neck cones after enduring the decontamination, much to her embarrassment; Mike did try to help her, but was stopped by Sulley. As a result, Celia is now angry at Mike and she confronts him the next day, and she unintentionally slips Mike's involvement in the incident the previous night while scolding him, which Randall discovers. When Mike and Sulley were being chased by Randall, Celia grabbed onto Mike, threatening to break up with him if he did not tell her what was happening; though Mike stated that they are trying to get Boo back to her room, Celia did not believe him at first until Boo appeared over Sulley's shoulder, startling her into letting go of Mike. Celia, having calmed down a bit, does a diversion by announcing that Randall had broken the Scare Record. She is seen again at the end of the film, having fully recovered and reconciled with Mike, and tells him that a box full of magazines has just arrived. Both she and Mike are surprised to see that Mike has made the cover of the magazine. Despite not appearing in Monsters University, Celia is seen in a photo in Mike's locker room, where he puts up a new photo of himself and Sulley on their first day as a Scarer Team, next to Celia's near the end of the movie.

In the television series Monsters at Work, Celia gets promoted to floor supervisor by Mike when the board of directors puts him and Sulley in charge of the company.

Fungus
Jeff Fungus (voiced by Frank Oz in the film, Christopher Swindle in Monsters at Work) is Randall's red three-eyed assistant. Despite being partnered with Fungus, Randall seems to be annoyed by his antics and would often abuse and boss him around. Fungus also is terrified by Randall's behavior and his involvement in Waternoose's plot to kidnap human children and extract their screams forcibly, but feels either blackmailed or too intimidated to confront Randall, and is inwardly glad that Mike and Sulley are sabotaging the sinister conspiracy. When Randall attempts to test the extraction machine on Mike, Sulley puts Fungus on the chair and rescues Mike. The scream machine renders Fungus nearly unconscious and blanches him white,  showing that the machine asphyxiates its victims. In the end following Randall's defeat and Waternoose's arrest, Fungus is forgiven for his involvement and is now happily taking on a job as Mike's assistant and making children laugh to collect more power.

Needleman and Smitty
Needleman and Smitty (both voiced by Daniel Gerson in the film and Stephen Stanton in Monsters at Work) are two goofy monsters who work as maintenance and errand monsters at Monsters, Inc. Both of them worship Sulley and the ground that he walks on. One of their jobs at Monsters, Inc. is to operate the Door Shredder, a woodchipper-like device that shreds the doors of children that are not afraid of monsters. In one of the outtakes of the film, Smitty accidentally calls Sullivan "Solomon", while another outtake sees the Door Shredder shred the door too fast; it later runs backstage with them holding on to it, almost destroying the backstage equipment and props.

Scarers of Floor F
The Scarers of Scare Floor F are the co-workers at Monsters, Inc. Apart from James P. Sullivan and Randall Boggs, among these are:

 Augustus "Spike" Jones is a red slug-like monster with tons of retractable purple spikes on his back. In Monsters University, it is shown that Spike had graduated from Fear Tech and was a former worker at Fear Co.

 Bob Peterson (voiced by Jack Angel in the film, Bob Peterson in Monsters at Work) is a light blue dinosaur-like monster with removable sharp teeth. He is named after the filmmaker of the same name.

 George Sanderson (voiced by Sam Black in the film, Stephen Stanton in Monsters at Work) is a chubby one-horned orange furry monster who is good friends with Mike, Sulley, Lanky, and Claws. In Monsters University, he was a member of the Jaws Theta Chi fraternity. In Monsters Inc, when George emerges from one of the doors with a sock on him, his assistant Charlie sees the sock and shouts "2319" which ends up calling in the CDA to take care of the situation. After the sock is removed and destroyed, George is then shaved, showered, and put into a neck cone. This becomes a running gag, as when in the locker room, the toys that Sulley hid in a nearby locker fall on George causing Charlie to shout "2319" which causes the CDA to work on him again. When Charlie picks out a door to a house in the Himalayas, Sulley emerges from it and unknowingly places a sock on him. Charlie shouts "2319", but this time, George shoves the sock in Charlie's mouth and banishes him by throwing him through the door. He escapes through the door and is with George seeing Waternoose being out in the CDA van. In the ending of the movie his fur grows back. In the Monsters at Work 10th episode, he still has no fur and is still wearing his cone since the first season takes place after Waternoose's arrest.

 Harley P. Gerson is an orange monster with only a large mouth and two legs. He named after Harley Jessup and Dan Gerson.

 Harry "Bud" Luckey is a thin turquoise octopus-like monster with long shaggy purple hair covering his face. He is a friend of James P. Sullivan Mike Wazowski. Bud was named after Bud Luckey, an animator for Pixar.

 Joe Ranft is a red velvet monster with huge fists and three eyes. He is named after the filmmaker of the same name.

 Nicholas "Lanky" Schmidt (voiced by Bob Bergen) is a monster with a small head and long arms and legs who is good friends with Pete "Claws" Ward and George Sanderson. When interviewed about the "kid-tastrophe", he exaggerates that Boo flew over him and used laser vision to blast a car. When the factory transfers to laughter, Lanky adapts well and his talent, utilizing a spinning bow tie, rivals Mike's.

 Pete "Claws" Ward (voiced by Joe Ranft) is a blue crocodile-like monster with retractable sharp claws and horrifying breath who is good friends with his assistant. When working on one door, he runs out and tells his assistant that the child he tried to scare almost touched him resulting in his assistant calling for a door shredder making it the 58th door the company lost this week.

 Ricky Plesuski is a green monster with a huge mouth filled with sharp teeth, two round eyes, and eight legs. In Monsters University, it is shown that Ricky had graduated from Fear Tech and was a former worker at Fear Co. and Scream Industries.

 Josh Rivera (voiced by Lee Unkrich) is a tall, slender orange monster with six tentacles for arms and four shorter tentacles for legs.

 Theodore "'Ted" Pauley (voiced by Katherine Ringgold in the film, Christopher Swindle in Monsters at Work) is a huge purple monster with a gorilla-like stature and 16 removable eyes. In Monsters at Work he now has a mouth and has an English accent. Due to his lack of sense of humour, Ted fails to transfer to being a comedian. He named after Bob Pauley. In an outtake of the film, as the scarers make their entrance to Scare Floor F, Sulley trips and falls, causing a domino effect where all the other scarers fall as well. After everybody gets tripped over, a crew member peeks his head out clapping the upside-down clapperboard.

Assistants to the Scarers of Floor F
 Betty (voiced by Teresa Ganzel) is a blue monster who is the assistant of Rivera.

 Charlie Proctor (voiced by Philip Proctor) is a light green monster with two round eyes and tentacles for arms that is the assistant of George Sanderson. He would often freak out whenever a human object would come in contact with George, leading to the latter's forcible decontamination by the CDA. By the third time when it came to a door leading to a kid's house in Nepal, Charlie tried to report it only for George to stuff it in Charlie's mouth and throw him into the door.

 Chuck (voiced by Danny Mann) is a pink frog-like monster with four arms and also assists Claws Ward. In the movie, there are four varieties of Chuck including him.

 Stuart is a turquoise monster with crab-like legs and a stalk with one eye who assists Harley Gerson.

 Frank (voiced by Paul Eiding) is a one-eyed four-armed green monster with no visible mouth that has a ruff of fur around his stalk. He also assists Bob Peterson.

 Kevin is a five-eyed slug-like monster who assists Ted Pauley. 

 Marge (voiced by Mickie McGowan) is a starfish-like monster and the assistant of Schmidt.

 Glen is a light green slender monster with around 4 or 5 legs who assists Joe J.J. Ranft.

 Eric is a red five-eyed slug-like monster and assists the hairy head Luckey.

 Waxford is a five-eyed monster with tentacles for legs that is the assistant of Spike. He was mentioned by Mike as having shifty eyes and was later seen with Randall asking if he knows anything about Boo.

 Zack is a three-eyed pistachio-like monster who assists Ricky.

Thaddeus Bile
Thaddeus Bile (voiced by Jeff Pidgeon in the film, Christopher Swindle in Monsters at Work) is a trainee Scarer who is also called "Phlegm". He is a dinosaur-like monster, with a coloration on each of his arms and hands, spikes on the back of his head, and a spiky tail club. He was seen at the beginning of the movie botching his training by leaving the door open as well as being scared by the simulation child (voiced by Lisa Raggio) causing him to slip on a soccer ball and fall on some jacks. By the time the factory begins transition to laugh power, he begins working on Scare Floor F where he has successfully made children laugh by slipping on a soccer ball and falling on some jacks, while additionally incorporating a skateboard into his routine.

Ms. Flint
Ms. Flint (voiced by Bonnie Hunt) is a female employee at Monsters, Inc. that manages the simulation tests that monsters must pass in order to become scarers. Ms. Flint is a tall monster with fins attached to her eyes, has long, sharp claws, wears a black jacket and a long, snake-like tail. In Monsters at Work, it is revealed that she has a daughter named Thalia (voiced by Hadley Gannaway).

Jerry Slugworth
Jerry Slugworth (voiced by Steve Susskind) is a red monster with blue strips on the center and thick maroon around his torso and legs, and seven fingers who works as a floor manager for Scare Floor F.

Tony
Tony (voiced by Guido Quaroni) is a tall, slender orange monster with a moustache, four tentacles for arms and five shorter tentacles for legs. He is a grocer that works at Tony's Grossery and was first seen telling Mike and Sulley that somebody is about to break the All-Scare Record and throws them blood oranges while wishing them the best of luck.

Ted
Ted is the largest monster in the movie; he is so big, only his elephant-like legs, covered with large, coarse brown scales, are shown at all. He mainly communicates using chicken sounds, yet he roars in one baseball-themed short featuring him. He is shown at a crossroads waiting for the light to change with Mike and Sulley. Sulley says "good morning" up at him, he crows back, then the light turns green, and Ted stomps across the road, causing an earthquake with every step. Mike is not happy with Sulley after the encounter since Sulley points out, ignoring Ted's size, that Ted was walking to work. His point being that they should too, only to be responded to by Mike who is frustrated since he wanted to drive his red sports car.

Appearing in Monsters University

University staff

Dean Abigail Hardscrabble
Dean Abigail Hardscrabble (voiced by Helen Mirren) is the strict dean of Monsters University. She is a red dragon-like monster with centipede-like legs and red bat wings. She was modeled after a type of centipede called Scolopendra gigantea, also known as the Amazonian giant centipede. When Dean Hardscrabble attended Monsters University in her youth, she was a member of the Eta Hiss Hiss sorority and is the founder and a four-time consecutive champion of the Scare Games. She first appears where she flies into Professor Derek Knight's class at the beginning of the first day. She then also appears during the Scare Exam at the end of the semester that helps to weed out the least-worthy scarers from the University's School of Scaring. Mike was evicted from the Scare Exam for being "not scary", while Sulley was kicked for not taking his studies seriously.

Mike later finds out that the only way to get back into the scaring program is to compete in the Scare Games with a fraternity of rejected monsters called Oozma Kappa. As a result, Mike strikes a deal with her - if he wins, Hardscrabble will accept all OK members into her program, and if he loses, he will leave the university forever. Sulley later joins as the team lacks a member and he also wants to make his way back in. During the Scare Games, Dean Hardscrabble is secretly watching Mike and Sulley competing from afar, aware and expecting that they are both going to fail. For the Toxicity challenge after Oozma Kappa came in last place, Hardscrabble stated to Mike that only a miracle can save him from expulsion, only for Brock Pearson to announce that Jaws Theta Chi is disqualified for using an illegal protective sting ointment during the Toxicity challenge, which puts Oozma Kappa back into the competition, although she still believes that they will eventually lose, even taunting Sulley over his confidence on Mike's mundane attributes.

Dean Hardscrabble then keeps an eye on Oozma Kappa during the remaining challenges. After Oozma Kappa wins the Games when they beat Roar Omega Roar in the final round with the scare simulators, Sulley confesses to Hardscrabble that he cheated by setting Mike's simulator level to easy just to make Oozma Kappa win due to Mike's inability to scare. Outraged, she attempts to expel him but is cut off when alerted by Mike's unauthorized entry into the door lab. Despite her attempts to stop him, Sulley forces his way in with a distraction from his friends. Dean Hardscrabble then shuts down the door in question until the CDA could arrive. However, Mike collaborates with Sulley, generating enough scream energy to brute force the door, and the power surge's chaos terrifies Hardscrabble.

Both are expelled by the institution, although she allows the remaining OK members to enroll in the scare program, and admits that the two have actually surprised her during the lab break-in and was impressed with their performance in the scare games.

Professor Derek Knight
Professor Derek Knight (voiced by Alfred Molina) is a dinosaur-like monster who teaches SCARING 101: Intro to Scaring at the School of Scaring. He often weeds out the least worthy students so that the best of the best can move on to becoming Scarers. Professor Knight is also shown to be a fan of Bill Sullivan, Sully's father. When he is first seen during the exam that would determine who will take part in the School of Scaring, Dean Abigail Hardscrabble "assists" him where she weeds out Mike for not being scary and Sully for doing an incorrect scare

Professor Knight is later seen with Dean Hardscrabble when Sully admits that he rigged Mike's scare simulator during the final Scare Games event.

During the credits, he has a card saying that he worked at Fear. Co.

Professor Knight is later seen in the opening of the first episode of Monsters at Work, overseeing Tylor's exam.

Professor William Brandywine
Professor William Brandywine is a round monster with yellow fur whose eyes are invisible. He works at Monsters University's School of Engineering where he teaches Scream Canister Designs to his students. Don Carlton's character model was used to make Professor Brandywine.

Librarian
The Librarian (voiced by Marcia Wallace) is an elderly female monster that works at the library at Monsters University. She is a large slug-headed teacher with six monstrous tentacles for legs and gray hair. The Librarian is involved in the "Avoid the Parent" challenge of the Scare Games where the Librarian's reaction to noise is made to emulate the danger of parents and how a Scarer has to get along without being caught by one. Any team who is caught by the Librarian is thrown out of the library and eliminated from the competition, which was the case for Slugma Slugma Kappa. The Oozma Kappa bypass her with the help of vocal distractions after Sulley accidentally alerts her by toppling a ladder.

Ed the Janitor
Ed (voiced by Philip Proctor) is a janitor at Monsters University. He appears during the post-credits telling the Slug Student that school year is over.

Oozma Kappa students
Oozma Kappa (OΚ, suggestive of "OK") is one of the six fraternities at Monsters University. It is mostly filled with good-natured misfits. Besides the protagonists Mike and Sulley, among the members of Oozma Kappa are:

 Don Carlton (voiced by Joel Murray) is a red-skinned mature monster with a bat-like mustache and octopus-like tentacles for arms who returned to Monsters University to learn how to use computers and maybe consider trying for scaring. He is the President of Oozma Kappa. Don later got engaged to Scott "Squishy" Squibbles' mother Sherri. During the credits, it is shown that Don had gotten a job as a scarer at Monsters, Inc. under the moniker "Dangerous Don Carlton".
 Art (voiced by Charlie Day) is a purple furry monster with an arch shape and a questionable background (in a scene he revealed that he was in jail before). It is shown during the credits that he got a job as a scarer at Monsters, Inc.
 Scott "Squishy" Squibbles (voiced by Peter Sohn) is a five-eyed jelly monster whose mother owns the fraternity house. It is shown during the credits that he got a job as a scarer at Monsters, Inc., under the moniker 'Scott "Scary" Squibbles'.
 Terri and Terry Perry (voiced by Sean Hayes and Dave Foley) are a two-headed monster with one eye on each head, four arms, and tentacles for legs. Terri's head has one horn while Terry's head has two horns. Terri, a dance major, is the naively optimistic one of the two while Terry, an English major, is more morose but has a fondness for close-up magic. They are very different personality wise but they work well together as shown in the Scare Games. It is shown during the credits that they got a job as a scarer at Monsters, Inc., under the moniker "Terrifying Terry and Terri Perry".

Roar Omega Roar students
Roar Omega Roar (RΩR, suggestive of "roar") is one of the six fraternities at Monsters University. It is made up of the best of the best as they are the smartest, most-skilled, and scariest monsters at Monsters University. Besides Randall, among the members of Roar Omega Roar are:

 Johnny J. "The Jaw" Worthington III (voiced by Nathan Fillion) is the confident President of Roar Omega Roar who is a big bully to Mike Wazowsk and Oozma Kappa as well is the rest of the RORs. He competes against Mike in the last round of the Scare Games. During the credits, it is shown that Johnny got a job as a Scarer at Fear Co.
 Chet "The Claw" Alexander (voiced by Bobby Moynihan) is a one-eyed lisping crab-like monster that serves as the Vice President of Roar Omega Roar. During the credits, it is shown that Chet got a job as a scarer at Fear Co. He competes against Terri and Terry in the final round of the Scare Games.
 Chip Goff is a purple monster with two horns and vampire fangs who roars like a Wookiee. He is the only member of the fraternity (Sulley not included) to wear a fraternity letterman jacket: the rest of the fraternity wear cardigans or letter sweaters in accordance with their "elite" image. He competes against Squishy in the final round of the Scare Games.
 "Howling" Javier Rios is an insect-like monster with four arms and pink eyes. He competes against Art in the final round of the Scare Games. During the credits, it is shown that he got a job as a scarer at Monsters, Inc.
 Reggie "Bruiser" Jacobs is a dark green monster with three eyes and grass-like hair all over his body. He competes against Don Carlton in the first wave, final round of the Scare Games during the scare simulator and loses to him. Johnny tells Reggie to “take an easy on Grandpa!” So after Don Carlton wins, he sarcastically tells Reggie “Thanks for taking it easy on Grandpa!” while smiling.

Python Nu Kappa students
Python Nu Kappa (PΝΚ, suggestive of "pink") is one of the six sororities at Monsters University. The female students here - aside from being near identical to each other with minor color differences - are smart, frozen-hearted, and merciless. Every time they get announced or tell Oozma Kappa they're "going to rip them to pieces", they all hiss and their eyes glow even in the dark. In the Scare Games, Python Nu Kappa was eliminated after they got lost in the maze and accidentally scared teenagers during the "Don't Scare the Teen" event. According to the "Monsters University Essential Guide", all of the members of Python Nu Kappa want to work at a crematorium. Among the members of Python Nu Kappa are:

 Carrie Williams (voiced by Beth Behrs) is a three-eyed pink monster with red hair who is the fearless President of Python Nu Kappa. During the credits, it is shown that Carrie got a job as a scarer at Scream Industries (although the Scare Card picture shown is actually that of Britney Davis, a differently colored member of the sorority).

Jaws Theta Chi students
Jaws Theta Chi (JΘΧ, suggestive of "jocks") is one of the six fraternities at Monsters University. The students here are big on brawn and small on brainpower. In the Scare Games, Jaws Theta Chi was disqualified for using a protective gel that would prevent them from painful swelling upon coming in contact with the "child's toys" (glowing sea urchins) during the "Toxicity Challenge" event. Besides George Sanderson, among the members of Jaws Theta Chi are:

 Roy "Big Red" O'Growlahan (voiced by John Cygan) is a big red monster with eye stalks who is the President of Jaws Theta Chi. He competed with Chris J. Hicks (an Omega Howl student) to get Sulley into their group. He later appears during the third episode of Monsters at Work.
 Dirk Pratt is a yellow furry monster with sharp teeth and a mace at the end of his tail.
 Omar Harris is a small bean-like monster with six legs and bat-like wings. During the credits, it is shown that he got a job at Scream Industries.
 Percy Boleslaw is a one-eyed purple monster with horns.
 Baboso Goretega is a blue slug-like monster who appears in promotional material for the film. He is never seen in the final film (except for a minor appearance in a Fear Tech jacket).

Slugma Slugma Kappa students
Slugma Slugma Kappa (ΣΣΚ, suggestive of "eek") is one of the six Sororities at Monsters University. The students here spend most of their days working out and running drills to perfect their scaring skills. In the Scare Games, Slugma Slugma Kappa was eliminated after they were caught by the Librarian during the "Avoid the Parent" event and thrown out thanks to a distraction from Oozma Kappa. Among the members of Slugma Slugma Kappa are:

 Carla Delgado is a pink monster with tentacles for arms and legs who is the President of Slugma Slugma Kappa. According to the "Monsters University Essential Guide", she is an ace swimmer.
 Brynn Larson is a purple three-eyed bean-shaped monster who can run fast.
 Debbie Gabler is a turquoise monster with turquoise hair. She has one eyestalk on top of her hair.
 Donna Soohoo is a purple snake-like monster with hair all over her head that is covering her face. During the credits, she gets a job at Monsters, Inc.
 Maria Garcia is an orange monster with parted hair covering one eye.
 Violet Steslick is a one-eyed purple monster with brown twisted horns.

Eta Hiss Hiss students
Eta Hiss Hiss (ΗSS, suggestive of "hiss") is one of the six Sororities at Monsters University. The students here have a goth and emo style. This was the sorority that Dean Hardscrabble was a part of when she attended Monsters University. In the Scare Games, Eta Hiss Hiss was eliminated after they did not find good hiding places in the "Hide and Sneak" event where they were caught by thr referee. According to the "Monsters University Fearbook" and the "Monsters University Extensive Guide", the members of Eta Hiss Hiss are an award-winning A Cappella group. Among the members of Eta Hiss Hiss are:

 Rosie Levin is a big greenish grey monster with glasses who is the president of Eta Hiss Hiss. Monsters at Work reveals she started working at Monsters, Inc. as a comedy student.
 Nadia Petrov is a three-eyed pink bean-shaped monster with purple hair. She is interested in books.
 Sonia Lewis is a snail like-blue monster with blackish blue hair.
 Susan Jensen is a tall monster with pink hair.
 Rhonda Boyd is a one-eyed snail like-monster.
 Nancy Kim is a short one-eyed monster.

Brock Pearson
Brock Pearson (voiced by Tyler Labine) is a massive purple bird-like monster two horns on his head and sharp claws on his hands. He is the Vice-President of the Greek Council. Brock and Claire commentate on the Scare Games.

Claire Wheeler
Claire Wheeler (voiced by Aubrey Plaza) is a three-eyed grey monster who is a member of the Greek Council. She and Brock commentate on the Scare Games. Claire was credited as "Greek Council President".

Slug Student
The Slug Student (voiced by Bill Hader) is a student that attended Monsters University, Despite his name, He is a yellow snail-like monster. When school starts, the Slug Student slithers to get to his class. By the time he gets to his classroom in the post-credits scene, he learns from Ed the janitor that the school year is over and that he missed it and slithers home.

He later appears in the fourth episode of Monsters at Work.

Sherry Squibbles
Ms. Sherry Squibbles (voiced by Julia Sweeney) is a monster who is the mother of Scott Squibbles. She also owns the Oozma Kappa fraternity house. By the end of the film, Sherry gets engaged to Don Carlton. She is also a Metalhead as proven in one scene where she listens to Metal music in her van.

Ms. Karen Graves
Ms. Karen Graves (voiced by Bonnie Hunt) is a pink snail-like monster that was Mike's grade school teacher.

"Frightening" Frank McCay
"Frightening" Frank McCay (voiced by John Krasinski) is a superstar Scarer who inspires Mike to want to be a Scarer. He is a tall, light blue monster with retractable claws, numerous spikes on his head, and five tentacles as legs.

Archie
Archie is the mascot of Fear Tech (a rival school of Monsters University) that Sulley steals, He is an orange scare pig with six legs and goat-like horns on his head. Mike later catches Archie by tipping over a trash can and trapping him. The other students gave Sulley the credit for catching Archie much to the dismay of Mike.

The Smile Squad
The Smile Squad is the team that helped Mike get registered for his first day and give him information about Monsters University. All of their names rhyme with "ay". Among the members are:

 Jay is a pink monster with two eyes on his head and tentacles for hands and legs. He contacts incoming students and directs them to the registration hall.
 Kay is a yellow bean-shaped monster with three eyes. She works at the registration table.
 Trey is a blue snail-like monster. He is in charge of taking the photo for a student's I.D. card.
 Fay is a blue monster with blue hair, two eyes on top of her head and tentacles for arms and legs. She gives new students an orientation tour of the university's facilities.
 Ray is blue monster with two eyes on his head. He is stationed at the dormitories and assigns new students their room.

Monsters, Inc. Professional Scarers
During Mike's childhood, his class encountered various Scarers in their field trip to Monsters, Inc.. Besides Frank McCay, among the famous Scarers are:

 "Jumping" Jerry Jablonski is a light green monster who is a recolored version of Rivera.
 "Screaming" Bob Gunderson is a shaggy red muskox-like monster with curly horns, bushy eyebrows that conceal his eyes completely, and a large mustache. 
 Betty Stevenson is a red one-eyed monster with two large cow-like horns.
 Carl Johnson is a purple one-eyed monster with a single horn on his head.
 Carla "Killer Claws" Benitez (voiced by Alanna Ubach in Monsters at Work) is a tall yellow monster with long purple claws who was seen during Oozma Kappa's "field trip" to Monsters, Inc.. She later appears in Monsters at Work as a comedy student and later promoted to jokester.
 Carol Dallmar is a yellow monster who is a recolored version of Ricky Plesuski.
 Clive Carver is a light blue monster who is a recolored version of Augustus "Spike" Jones.
 Darryl Payne is a green monster with long, thin arms and legs, three eyes, and sharp spikes covering his body.
 Dorothy "The Pink Widow" Newbern is a pink pompom spider-like monster.
 Earl "The Terror" Thompson is a blue monster with four eyes and a dark blue mustache resembling a tarantula. He was a famous scarer working at Monsters, Inc., who had a particularly long career, continuing to scare at old age. 
 Hank "The Tank" Knapp is a dark green, frog-like monster. In the earlier parts of the film, Hank argues with Frank about the superiority between Monsters University and Fear Tech.
 Jason Chiang is a red-and-yellow-striped monster with bat-like wings.
 Raj Kapoor is a purple rhinoceros-like monster with spike-like "hair" and a short horn on his nose.
 Rufus Remerez is a maroon monster that is a recolored version of Ricky Plesuski.
 The Kowalski Sisters - Tracey, Stacey and Casey are a three-headed purple dragon-like monster.
 Tommy Gill is a rectangular yellow monster with one eye, scale-like hair, and dark yellow spots.
 Walter "Wailing Walt" Friedman is a shaggy yellow monster with three horns on his head and two upward-pointing fangs.
 Willy Nowicki is a blue slug-like monster with bat wings and two horns on his head.
 Sheldon "Lockness" Kayola is a yellow mug-like bat with oranges in his horns on top of his bald soft head.

Appearing in Monsters at Work

Tyler Tuskman
Tylor Tuskmon (voiced by Ben Feldman) is a recent graduate of Monsters University. He was accepted into Monsters Inc. the same day Waternoose was outed as CEO and the company switched energy sources from screaming to laughter. He transferred to the maintenance team, Monsters Inc. Facilities Team (MIFT), while moonlighting as a comedy student. When Monsters, Inc. changed its policy from scaring to joking following Waternoose's arrest, Tylor was perplexed by this new role. He is promoted to a full-time Jokester.

Val Little
Val Little (voiced by Mindy Kaling) is a mechanic at MIFT, and Tylor's best friend. Val was briefly in the same class as Tylor at Monsters University before she dropped out. After college, she spent a year on an island, then enlisted at MIFT as a mechanic. She becomes Tylor's Jokester assistant.

Mr. Crummyham
Mr. Crummyham (voiced by Curtis Armstrong) is a Monsters, Inc. supervisor. He transfers Tylor to MIFT when he learns that Tylor's parents work at a hardware store.

Monsters, Inc. Facilities Team
The Monsters, Inc. Facilities Team (or MIFT for short) is a department in Monsters, Inc. that are called in to deal with the technical problems in the company. Besides Tyler Tuskman and Val, MIFT consists of:

 Fritz (voiced by Henry Winkler) is a one-eyed monster with a trunk who is the leader of MIFT.
 Katherine "Cutter" Sterns (voiced by Alanna Ubach) is a three-eyed crab-like monster and member of MIFT.
Duncan P. Anderson (voiced by Lucas Neff) is the deputy supervisor of MIFT with four eyestalks. He does not trust Tylor and attempts to get him dismissed from MIFT.
 Roto (vocal effects provided by Bobs Gannaway) - Duncan's hamster-like emotional support animal.

Winchester
Winchester (vocal effects provided by Dee Bradley Baker) is a former member of MIFT. Due to his inability to talk (he can merely make raspberry noises), his co-workers never learned his name until he left the group; they had nicknamed him "Banana Bread", since he always brought banana cakes and pastries to the briefing room. While trying to get Tylor to return to MIFT, Winchester catches Ms. Flint's attention, who promotes him to comedian.

Roze
Roze (voiced by Bob Peterson) is Roz's identical twin sister who is given Roz's position as secretary after her investigation work is complete. She shares her sister's complete disdain for Mike.

Millie Tuskman
Millie Tuskmon (voiced by Aisha Tyler) is Tylor's mother.

Bernard Tuskman
Bernard Tuskman (voiced by John Ratzenberger) is Tylor's father.

Otis
Otis (voiced by Bobs Gannaway) is Monsters, Inc.'s new receptionist after Celia gets promoted to floor supervisor by Mike.

Gary Gibbs
Gary Gibbs (voiced by Gabriel Iglesias) is Mike's dark-blue arch-nemesis who is talented at bowling.

References

Characters
Lists of Disney animated film characters
Pixar characters